Kirit may refer to:

Places 
 Kirit, Togdheer, a town in Somaliland
 Kırıt, Tarsus, a village in Turkey

People 
 Steve Kirit (born 1972), American strongman competitor
 Kirit Bikram Kishore Deb Barman (1933–2006), king of Tripura, India
 Kirit Khan (1955–2006), Bengali-Indian sitar player
 Kirit Parikh, Indian academic
 Kirit Raval (died 2005), Indian attorney
 Kirit Shelat (born 1946), Indian public administrator
 Kirit Premjibhai Solanki (born 1950), Indian surgeon and politician
 Kirit Somaiya (born 1954), Indian

See also 
 
 Kirti